Alto (Spanish for "Tall") is a census-designated place adjacent to Mill Valley in Marin County, California. It lies at an elevation of 26 feet (8 m). The population was 732 at the 2020 census.

Geography

Demographics

At the 2010 census Alto had a population of 711. The racial makeup of Alto was 619 (87.1%) White, 8 (1.1%) African American, 2 (0.3%) Native American, 30 (4.2%) Asian, 1 (0.1%) Pacific Islander, 16 (2.3%) from other races, and 35 (4.9%) from two or more races. Hispanic or Latino of any race were 51 people (7.2%).

The census reported that 100% of the population lived in households.

There were 297 households, 108 (36.4%) had children under the age of 18 living in them, 140 (47.1%) were opposite-sex married couples living together, 34 (11.4%) had a female householder with no husband present, 6 (2.0%) had a male householder with no wife present.  There were 17 (5.7%) unmarried opposite-sex partnerships, and 0 (0%) same-sex married couples or partnerships. 33.7% of households were one person and 10.1% were one person aged 65 or older. The average household size was 2.39. There were 180 families (60.6% of households); the average family size was 3.05.

The age distribution was 177 people (24.9%) under the age of 18, 47 people (6.6%) aged 18 to 24, 188 people (26.4%) aged 25 to 44, 236 people (33.2%) aged 45 to 64, and 63 people (8.9%) who were 65 or older.  The median age was 41.0 years. For every 100 females, there were 81.8 males.  For every 100 females age 18 and over, there were 79.2 males.

There were 313 housing units at an average density of 2,489.1 per square mile, of the occupied units 157 (52.9%) were owner-occupied and 140 (47.1%) were rented. The homeowner vacancy rate was 0.6%; the rental vacancy rate was 4.1%. 60.3% of the population lived in owner-occupied housing units and 39.7% lived in rental housing units.

References

Census-designated places in Marin County, California
Census-designated places in California